Blizzard Entertainment is an American video game developer and publisher based in Irvine, California. The company was founded in February 1991 under the name Silicon & Synapse by Michael Morhaime, Frank Pearce and Allen Adham. The company initially concentrated on porting other studio's games to computer platforms, as well RPM Racing (1991), a remake of Racing Destruction Set (1985). In 1992, however, the company began producing original games for home consoles with The Lost Vikings (1992) and Rock n' Roll Racing (1993), and beginning with Warcraft: Orcs & Humans (1994) it shifted to primarily focus on original computer games. The company was renamed to Blizzard Entertainment in 1994, and in 1996 the company Condor, then developing Diablo (1997), was merged with Blizzard and renamed to Blizzard North; it remained a separate studio for the company until it was closed in 2005.

Blizzard was acquired by distributor Davidson & Associates in 1994, and a chain of acquisitions over the next four years led Blizzard to being a part of Vivendi Games, a subsidiary of Vivendi; when Vivendi Games merged with Activision in 2008 the resulting company was named Activision Blizzard. The name was retained when Activision Blizzard became an independent company in 2013, while Blizzard itself has been an independent subsidiary company throughout.

Since the late 1990s, Blizzard has focused almost exclusively on the Warcraft, Diablo, StarCraft, and Overwatch series. All of Blizzard's games released since 2004 still receive expansions and updates, especially the long-running massively multiplayer online role-playing game World of Warcraft (2004). With over 100 million lifetime accounts as of 2014 and US$9 billion in revenue as of 2017, World of Warcraft is one of the best-selling computer games and highest-grossing video games of all time. Blizzard Entertainment has developed 19 games since 1991, in addition to developing 8 ports between 1992 and 1993; 11 of those games are in the Warcraft, Diablo, and StarCraft series.

Games

As Silicon & Synapse

As Blizzard Entertainment

Ports

Cancelled

Notes

References

External links
 

Blizzard Entertainment